Liyang Plain or Liyang Pingyuan is a plain is located in the middle and lower reaches of the Lishui River on the northwestern shore of Dongting Lake in Hunan Province. It includes numerous rivers and lakes.

Liyang Plain is recognized as one of the first places where rice cultivation originated in the world.

References

Plains
Geography of Central China
Landforms of Hunan
Landforms of Asia
Regions of China
Plains of China
Plains of Asia